ECS Solid State Letters (SSL) is a peer-reviewed scientific journal covering the field of solid state science and technology. The journal was established in 2012 and is published by the Electrochemical Society. SSL ceased publication at the end of 2015. The editor-in-chief was Dennis W. Hess (Georgia Institute of Technology).  According to the Journal Citation Reports, the journal has a 2014 impact factor of 1.162.

References

External links 
 

Materials science journals
Publications established in 2012
Solid-state chemistry
Academic journals published by learned and professional societies
Monthly journals
English-language journals
Electrochemical Society academic journals